Andriy Mykhailovych Verevskyi (born July 25, 1974) is a Ukrainian entrepreneur, founder and chairman of the board of Kernel, a Ukrainian diversified agri company. Verevskiy is a former deputy of Ukrainian parliament member of the Party of Regions faction and a fellow of the Agrarian Policy and Land Relations Committee.

Education and career 

Graduated with a bachelor's degree in agronomics from the National Agrarian University. Oxford College graduate. In 1995 founded a small grain trading enterprise focusing on grain exports out of Ukraine, which through the years grew into a present Kernel. Chairman of the board and majority shareholder of Kernel Holding S.A. since 2007.

Business 

Verevskiy is the founder, largest shareholder and Chairman of the board of Kernel Holding S.A. since 2007. Kernel Holding S.A. is an agri-business value chain management company operating in Ukraine, providing production, processing, storage, transshipment and export of agricultural commodities, the company supplies grain, sunflower oil (35% of Ukraine's market and meal produced in Ukraine and Russia; the largest supplier of bottled sunflower oil to the Ukrainian market; provider of grain silo services to farmers, and provider of services for the transshipment and export of grain, oil and meal from Black Sea ports.

Kernel Holding S.A. completed the initial public offering (IPO) on the Warsaw Stock Exchange (WSE) raising $221 million in November 2007. Since the debut on the WSE the market capitalisation of the company has tripled and reached US$2 billion in 2011. The IPO of Kernel Holding S.A. was named the Best IPO in Central and Eastern Europe on the WSE. Kernel is a member of WIG20 index of the Warsaw Stock Exchange.

In 2012, US Forbes Magazine valued net worth of Andrey Verevskiy at US$1 billion. In April 2016 the Ukrainian magazine Focus estimated his wealth at $642 million.

Political activity

2002–2006, Verkhovna Rada parliamentary deputy of the 4th convocation. Fellow of the Verkhovna Rada Finance and Banking Committee. Until December 2004, member of the United Ukraine faction, European Choice group and Regions of Ukraine faction. From June 2005, member of Yulia Tymoshenko Bloc's faction.

2006–2007, parliamentary deputy of Ukraine of the 5th convocation, from the Yulia Tymoshenko Bloc. Fellow of the Agrarian Policy and Land Relations Committee. At the moment of elections, member of the Batkivshchyna party.

From 2007, parliamentary deputy of Ukraine of the 6th convocation, from the Yulia Tymoshenko Bloc. Fellow of the Agrarian Policy and Land Relations Committee.

In June 2010, Verevskiy crossed to the Stability and Reform coalition formed by the Party of Regions, Lytvyn Bloc and Communist Party factions. Since October 2010, member of the Party of Regions faction.

Verevskiy was placed at number 46 on the electoral list of Party of Regions during the 2012 Ukrainian parliamentary election. He was re-elected into parliament. The Higher Administrative Court of Ukraine stripped Verevsky of his seat in parliament on 5 March 2013 because he simultaneously was parliamentary deputy and headed a commercial entity.

Personal life
Andrey is married and has two sons and a daughter.

References

External links
 Andrey Verevskiy – Forbes.com
 Ukraine’s Kernel raises $220m in Warsaw IPO
 Kernel IPO, Kyivpost
 Like clockwork: Andriy Verevskyi talks about competitors, grinding a steak with a knife with blood on Forbes Ukraine (June 5, 2012) 
 Andriy Verevskyi's dossier on korrespondent.net (badlink)  web.archive.org
 Financial Reports — Kernel

1974 births
Living people
All-Ukrainian Union "Fatherland" politicians
Party of Regions politicians
Ukrainian food industry businesspeople
Fourth convocation members of the Verkhovna Rada
Fifth convocation members of the Verkhovna Rada
Sixth convocation members of the Verkhovna Rada
Seventh convocation members of the Verkhovna Rada
Expelled members of the Verkhovna Rada
National University of Life and Environmental Sciences of Ukraine alumni
Politicians from Poltava